Mogus may refer to:

People
 Leo Mogus, American basketball player
 Mogus Wolde Mikael, Eritrean military officer
 Milan Moguš, Croatian linguist and academician